Guimond is a surname. Guimont is the original French spelling. Notable people with the surname include:

Arthé Guimond (1931–2013), Canadian Roman Catholic bishop
Claude Guimond (born 1963), Canadian politician
Colette Guimond (born 1961), Canadian bodybuilder
Janie Guimond (born 1984), Canadian volleyball player
Michel Guimond (1953–2015), Canadian politician
Sacha Guimond (born 1991), Canadian ice hockey player

See also
Vimont (disambiguation)
Sainte-Anne-de-Beaupré

Surnames of French origin
Germanic-language surnames